Kim Yoo-Jin (born June 19, 1983) is a South Korean retired football defender.

His previous clubs include K-League side Suwon Bluewings, Busan I'Park and J2 League side Yokohama.

Club statistics

References

External links
 
 

1983 births
Living people
South Korean footballers
Association football defenders
Suwon Samsung Bluewings players
Korean Police FC (Semi-professional) players
Busan IPark players
Sagan Tosu players
Yokohama FC players
Liaoning F.C. players
Kim Yoo-jin
K League 1 players
J2 League players
Chinese Super League players
South Korean expatriate footballers
South Korean expatriate sportspeople in Japan
South Korean expatriate sportspeople in China
South Korean expatriate sportspeople in Thailand
Expatriate footballers in Japan
Expatriate footballers in China
Expatriate footballers in Thailand
Sportspeople from Busan